Borivske is an urban-type settlement in Sievierodonetsk Raion (district) in Luhansk Oblast of eastern Ukraine, about  NWbW of the centre of Luhansk city. Population: 

Until 18 July 2020, Borivske was located in Sievierodonetsk Municipality. The municipality was abolished that day as part of the administrative reform of Ukraine and the number of raions of Luhansk Oblast was reduced to eight, of which only four were controlled by the government. Sievierodonetsk Municipality was merged into Sievierodonetsk Raion. Since 25 June 2022, Borivske is occupied by Russian regular and proxy forces.

Demographics
Native language distribution as of the Ukrainian Census of 2001:
 Russian: 94.67%
 Ukrainian: 5.16%
 Others: 0.03%

References

Urban-type settlements in Sievierodonetsk Raion
Sievierodonetsk Raion
Starobelsky Uyezd